Kinse Kalibre is the sixth studio album by the nu metal/metalcore band Slapshock, released in 2011.

Track listing

Personnel 
Jamir Garcia – vocals
Chi Evora – drums
Lee Nadela - bass
Leandro Ansing - guitar

Additional Musician:
Lourd De Veyra - Spoken Words (track 1)
Guartered, Light of Luna & Even - chants (track 7)
Dyanne Lucionne - Guest Vocals (track 10)

Album Credits 
Recorded and Engineered by: Lean Ansing
Mixed by: JD Wong at Twenty One O Five Productions
Mastered by: John Greenham at Area 51 Mastering, San Francisco California
Photography by: Xander Angeles of Edge of Light Studios
Art Direction, Layout & Graphic Design by: Team Manila & Graphic Design Studio

References

Slapshock albums
2011 albums